USS Merrimac (sometimes mistakenly called USS Merrimack) was a United States Navy collier during the Spanish–American War. It was the only American vessel sunk by the Spanish Navy in that conflict although it had managed to leave some smaller ships quite damaged in skirmishes such as the Battle of Cárdenas or the Battle of Manzanillo.

History 

Merrimac, a steamship, was built by Swan & Hunter shipyard as SS Solveig in Wallsend, England, in November 1894. It was purchased by the US Navy in April 1898. Rear Admiral William T. Sampson ordered her to be sunk as a blockship at the entrance of Santiago Harbor, Cuba, in an attempt to trap the Spanish fleet in the harbor.

On the night of 2–3 June 1898, eight volunteers attempted to execute this mission, but Merrimacs steering gear was disabled by the fire of Spanish land-based howitzers.  The American steamer was later sunk by the combined gunfire and the torpedoes of the armored cruiser Vizcaya, the unprotected cruiser Reina Mercedes, and the destroyer Plutón without obstructing the harbor entrance. Its crewmen were rescued by the Spanish and made prisoners of war. 

After the Battle of Santiago de Cuba destroyed the Spanish fleet a month later, the men were released. All eight were awarded Medals of Honor for their part in the mission.

Volunteers 
The eight volunteer crewman of the Merrimac were:
 Lieutenant Richmond P. Hobson
 Coxswain Claus K. R. Clausen
 Coxswain Osborn W. Deignan
 Coxswain John E. Murphy
 Chief Master-At-Arms Daniel Montague
 Gunner's Mate First Class George Charette
 Machinist First Class George F. Phillips
 Watertender Francis Kelly

Notes

References 
 Sinking of the U.S. Navy Collier Merrimac
 Hobson, Richmond Pearson (1899). The Sinking of the Merrimac. Classics of Naval Literature. Naval Institute Press. 
 
 

 

Ships built on the River Tyne
Steamships of Norway
Steamships of the United States Navy
1894 ships
Spanish–American War naval ships of the United States
Maritime incidents in 1898
Shipwrecks in the Caribbean Sea
Shipwrecks of the Spanish–American War
Battles and conflicts without fatalities
Ships sunk with no fatalities
Ships built by Swan Hunter